Thomasina Elizabeth Jordan (Red Hawk Woman) (? – 1999) was an American Indian activist who became the first American Indian to serve in the United States Electoral College in 1988.

Jordan received bachelor's and master's degrees in fine arts at Bishop Lee College in Boston. She studied at Harvard University, received an educational doctorate from The Catholic University of America, and attended the American Academy of Fine Arts in New York City.  She later resided in Alexandria, Virginia, where she was a member of the Alexandria Republican City Committee.

Jordan was appointed Chairperson of the Virginia Council on Indians by Governors George Allen and Jim Gilmore.

She also founded the American Indian Cultural Exchange, served on the Board of Directors of Save the Children and the National Rehabilitation Hospital, was president of Chapter I of the Capital Speakers Club, and was a recipient of the Medal of Honor of the National Society of the Daughters of the American Revolution.

According to a resolution passed by the Virginia General Assembly honoring her life, "Thomasina Jordan was instrumental throughout the years in bringing Indian issues to the forefront in the General Assembly, including legislation to correct birth certificates to identify Native Americans as such, allow animal parts and feathers to be used in religious regalia, and memorialize the United States Congress to grant historic federal recognition to Virginia’s state-recognized tribes."

Congress first considered a recognition bill, as championed by Jordan and others, in 2000. Six Virginia tribes eventually gained federal recognition in 2018 under an act bearing her name, the Thomasina E. Jordan Indian Tribes of Virginia Federal Recognition Act of 2017.

References

1929 births
1999 deaths
Activists from Virginia
Catholic University of America alumni
Harvard University alumni
People from Alexandria, Virginia
Native American activists
Women in Virginia politics
Virginia Republicans
Native American history of Virginia
20th-century American women
20th-century Native American women
20th-century Native Americans